Idea Zee Cinestars was a popular talent-hunt reality show that began its second season after the success of its first season show India's Best Cinestars Ki Khoj on Zee TV channel in 2006. The second season of the show was produced by Optimystix Entertainment. The show went on air in the first week of November and had its Grand Finale in March 2007 at a glittering 2 hour ground event that was televised live.

Concept
The show's main concept is to find Bollywood's next superstar among many of the contestants who participated. This is a reality/talent show and is a hunt for Bollywood's next superstars. It is a platform where contestants display their talent to on-looking nation and get voted as the next Bollywood star.

Zee Cinestars is a platform for every Indian youth who dreams of making it in the movies. A 1 hour talent hunt show; it will feature participants from various cities in the country, who will showcase their acting and dancing skills in the show. The aim of the show is to find two potential stars, who will be given an opportunity to feature in their forthcoming film which is to be produced by a leading banner.

This reality series is split into various stages and will essentially showcase the ecstasy, trauma, victory and defeat through 18 weeks. The hunt will narrow down to 2 Best performers from the entire nation. 60 participants will be brought down to Bombay – ‘The City of Dreams’, where, over the weeks they will begin to get eliminated to give us the winners of Zee Cinestars. The 60 participants are grouped as couples who will be groomed by Bollywood’s popular Directors and Choreographers. The Best couple is chosen by the viewers who have been voting for their favourite performers, through the weeks. This journey to fame is interwoven with the trials and tribulations of the participants who are thriving to be introduced to Hindi Cinema as actors.

Jury
Aman Verma (Host)
Anupam Kher (Judge)
Pooja Bhatt (Judge)
Madhur Bhandarkar (Judge)

Winners of Zee Cinestars 2007
Piyush Chopra --- Group B
Sabina Sheema --- Group B(http://www.missmalini.com/2013/12/11/exclusive-sabina-sheema-on-acting-with-dimple-kapadia-in-what-the-fish/ )

Runner-up Zee Cinestars 2007
Gaurav Bajpai  --- Group B  Yeh Vaada Raha (TV series)
Chandani Desai --- Group B

Contestants

Group A
Aadil Sharma
Mamta Dutta
Manav Sharma
Pallavi Dutt
Mrityunjay Nigam
Piku Sharma
Rahul Manchanda
Rakhi Verma
Rizwan Sikander
Ritwika Ghoshal
Sahil Arora
Varsha Lodh
Rati Pandey
Varun Jaiswal

Group B
Aalesha Syed
Ajay Chabria
Ankita Lokhande
Ashif
Chandani Desai
Gaurav Bajpai
Kanchan More
Hardik Soni
Minal Gorpade
Kartik Shetty
Rachel Gurjar
Prabhjot Dhillon
Surod Rizvi
Rohit Raghav
Piyush Chopra
Raj Saluja
Ruchika Babbar
Sabina Sheema
Vinay Kamble

Additional information
The auditions of the 2nd season were held in Mumbai, Pune, Kanpur, Haryana, New Delhi, Ranchi, Varnasi, as well as internationally in United States and UK.
Some of the top Bollywood celebrities that participated in the show were Anil Kapoor, Juhi Chawla, Fardeen Khan, Rakhi Sawant, Shilpa Shetty, Esha Deol, Bappi Lahiri, and many more.

External links
Official Site
Idea Zee Cinestars on Optimystix Entertainment
Fan Site on Sify.com

Zee TV original programming
Indian reality television series
2006 Indian television series debuts
2007 Indian television series endings